In the 1893 season, Somerset County Cricket Club played their seventh season of first-class cricket, and participated in the County Championship for the third season. They finished eighth in the competition, falling five positions from the previous year. Their captain, Herbie Hewett, completed the season as the club's leading run-scorer, accruing 669 runs in the Championship. The left-arm spinner Ted Tyler took the most wickets for the county, with 86. Matches were also played against Oxford University, and the touring Australians.

County Championship

Season standings
Note: Pld = Played, W = Wins, L = Losses, D = Draws, Pts = Points.

Notes:
Team marked  won the County Championship.

Match log and statistics

University match

Tourist match

Notes and references
References

Bibliography
 
 

1893 in English cricket
English cricket seasons in the 19th century
Somerset County Cricket Club seasons